The Theban Tomb TT54 is located in Sheikh Abd el-Qurna, part of the Theban Necropolis, on the west bank of the Nile, opposite to Luxor. It was originally the burial place of the ancient Egyptian official Hui, who was an official during the reign of Thutmose IV and Amenhotep III. However, it was usurped later in the 19th Dynasty by another official, Kenro, and his son Khonsu.

See also
 List of Theban tombs

References

Buildings and structures completed in the 13th century BC
Theban tombs